The following television stations operate on virtual channel 12 in Mexico:

Regional networks
Radio y Televisión de Hidalgo in the state of Hidalgo

Local stations
XEWT-TDT in Tijuana, Baja California
XHTUG-TDT in Tuxtla Gutiérrez, Chiapas
XHAMO-TDT in Colima, Colima
XHND-TDT in Durango, Durango
XHAK-TDT in Hermosillo, Sonora
XHFM-TDT in Veracruz, Veracruz

12 virtual